Low-density lipoprotein receptor-related protein 6 is a protein that in humans is encoded by the LRP6 gene. LRP6 is a key component of the LRP5/LRP6/Frizzled co-receptor group that is involved in canonical Wnt pathway.

Structure
LRP6 is a transmembrane low-density lipoprotein receptor that shares a similar structure with LRP5. In each protein, about 85% of its 1600-amino-acid length is extracellular. Each has four β-propeller motifs at the amino terminal end that alternate with four epidermal growth factor (EGF)-like repeats. Most extracellular ligands bind to LRP5 and LRP6 at the β-propellers. Each protein has a single-pass, 22-amino-acid segment that crosses the cell membrane and a 207-amino-acid segment that is internal to the cell.

Function
LRP6 acts as a co-receptor with LRP5 and the Frizzled protein family members for transducing signals by Wnt proteins through the canonical Wnt pathway.

Interactions
Canonical WNT signals are transduced through Frizzled receptor and LRP5/LRP6 coreceptor to downregulate GSK3beta (GSK3B) activity not depending on Ser-9 phosphorylation. Reduction of canonical Wnt signals upon depletion of LRP5 and LRP6 results in p120-catenin degradation.

LRP6 is regulated by extracellular proteins in the Dickkopf (Dkk) family (like DKK1), sclerostin, R-spondins and members of the cysteine-knot-type protein family.

Clinical significance
Loss-of-function mutations or LRP6 in humans lead to increased plasma LDL and triglycerides, hypertension, diabetes and osteoporosis. Similarly, mice with a loss-of-function Lrp6 mutation have low bone mass. LRP6 is critical in bone's anabolic response to parathyroid hormone (PTH) treatment, whereas LRP5 is not involved. On the other hand, LRP6 does not appear active in mechanotransduction (bone's response to forces), while LRP5 is critical in that role. 
Sclerostin, one of the inhibitors of LRP6, is a promising osteocyte-specific Wnt antagonist in osteoporosis clinical trials.

References

Further reading